This article is about the particular significance of the year 1840 to Wales and its people.

Incumbents
Lord Lieutenant of Anglesey – Henry Paget, 1st Marquess of Anglesey 
Lord Lieutenant of Brecknockshire – Penry Williams
Lord Lieutenant of Caernarvonshire – Peter Drummond-Burrell, 22nd Baron Willoughby de Eresby 
Lord Lieutenant of Cardiganshire – William Edward Powell
Lord Lieutenant of Carmarthenshire – George Rice, 3rd Baron Dynevor 
Lord Lieutenant of Denbighshire – Sir Watkin Williams-Wynn, 5th Baronet (until 6 January); Robert Myddelton Biddulph (from 8 February)   
Lord Lieutenant of Flintshire – Robert Grosvenor, 1st Marquess of Westminster 
Lord Lieutenant of Glamorgan – John Crichton-Stuart, 2nd Marquess of Bute 
Lord Lieutenant of Merionethshire – Sir Watkin Williams-Wynn, 5th Baronet (until 6 January); Edward Lloyd-Mostyn, 2nd Baron Mostyn (from 25 January)
Lord Lieutenant of Monmouthshire – Capel Hanbury Leigh
Lord Lieutenant of Montgomeryshire – Edward Herbert, 2nd Earl of Powis
Lord Lieutenant of Pembrokeshire – Sir John Owen, 1st Baronet
Lord Lieutenant of Radnorshire – George Rodney, 3rd Baron Rodney

Bishop of Bangor – Christopher Bethell 
Bishop of Llandaff – Edward Copleston 
Bishop of St Asaph – William Carey 
Bishop of St Davids – John Jenkinson (until 7 July); Connop Thirlwall (from 9 August)

Events
1 January - Trial of Chartists John Frost, Zephaniah Williams and William Jones for their part in the Newport Rising of 1839 continues at Monmouth before Chief Justice Tindal. This is the first trial where proceedings are recorded in shorthand.
16 January - Frost, Williams and Jones are all found guilty of high treason for their part in the Chartist riots, and are sentenced to death - the last time the sentence of hanging, drawing and quartering is passed in the United Kingdom, although following a nationwide petitioning campaign and, extraordinarily, direct lobbying of the Home Secretary by the Lord Chief Justice, it is commuted to transportation for life (and Frost is much later pardoned).
5 June - Joseph Brown is appointed Vicar Apostolic of the Roman Catholic District of Wales, being consecrated as a bishop on 28 October.
8 October - Taff Vale Railway is officially opened, the first steam-worked passenger railway in Wales, running from Cardiff docks to Navigation House at Abercynon via the Cardiff station known in modern days as Queen Street. Public service begins the following day.
30 October - First branch of the Church of Jesus Christ of Latter-day Saints in Wales formed in Flintshire.
18 November - The paddle steamer City of Bristol is wrecked at Llangennith, Gower, drowning about 22 people.
Approximate date - Rebuilding of Gregynog Hall with extensive use of concrete begins.

Arts and literature
An eisteddfod is held at Liverpool.

New books

English language
Sir John Hanmer - Memorials of the Parish and Family of Hanmer
William Lloyd - The Narrative of a Journey from Cawnpoor to the Boorendo Pass

Welsh language
Evan Davies (Eta Delta) - Y Weinidogaeth a'r Eglwysi
David Price (Dewi Dinorwig) - Y Catechism Cyntaf
Taliesin Williams - Hynafiaeth ac Awdurdodaeth Coelbren y Beirdd

Music
John Orlando Parry - Wanted: a Governess (opera)

Births
7 February - Charles Warren, military and police officer and archaeologist (died 1927)
21 June - Sir John Rhŷs, educationist (died 1915)
16 September - Alfred Thomas, 1st Baron Pontypridd (died 1927)
29 November - Rhoda Broughton, novelist (died 1920)
3 December - Francis Kilvert, diarist (died 1879)
5 December - John E. Jones, governor of Nevada (died 1896)
17 December - Matthew Vaughan-Davies, 1st Baron Ystwyth, politician (died 1935)

Deaths
6 January - Sir Watkin Williams-Wynn, 5th Baronet, politician and soldier, 67
17 March - William Williams of Wern, 58
19 May - John Blackwell (Alun), poet, 42?
7 July - John Jenkinson, Bishop of St Davids, 58
17 December - George Hay Dawkins-Pennant, politician, 76

References

Wales